Hrekivka (until 2016 Petrivske (Петрі́вське)) is a village in Svatove Raion (district) in Luhansk Oblast of eastern Ukraine, at about  northwest from the centre of Luhansk city. It belongs to Krasnorichenske hromada, one of the hromadas of Ukraine.

The village came under attack by Russian forces in 2022, during the Russian invasion of Ukraine, and was regained by Ukrainian forces on 5 October the same year.

References

Villages in Svatove Raion
Populated places established in 1961